USS Surprise (PG-63), the fourth American naval ship of the name, was a  patrol gunboat during World War II. She was built as the British  corvette HMS Heliotrope, and was in service with the Royal Navy  during the first years of the Battle of the Atlantic. She was loaned to and operated by the United States Navy from 1942–1945. After World War II, she was sold as a merchant vessel and ended her life in the Chinese navy as Lin I.

Design and construction
HMS Heliotrope was built by John Crown and Sons Ltd, Sunderland, England, as part of the 1939 building programme. She was laid down on 23 October 1939 and launched on 5 June 1940. The ship was completed and entered service on 12 September 1940, being named for the flower heliotrope, the second ship of that name. As built, Heliotrope had the short forecastle that was a feature of the early Flower-class corvette, and which adversely effected their habitability. This was rectified during a refit, with the enclosed deck extended back to be level with the funnel.

Service history

Royal Navy
After working up, Heliotrope was assigned to the Western Approaches Escort Force for service as a convoy escort. In this role she was engaged in all the duties performed by escort ships; protecting convoys, searching for and attacking U-boats which attacked ships in convoy, and rescuing survivors.

In 18 months service Heliotrope escorted 18 North Atlantic, eight Gibraltar and four South Atlantic convoys, assisting in the safe passage of over 750 ships.

She was involved in four major convoy battles: In October 1940 Heliotrope was part of the escort for HX 79, which was attacked by a U-boat "wolfpack", losing 12 ships sunk. In May 1941 she joined HX 126 which saw nine ships sunk and one U-boat damaged. In August 1941 she joined SL 81 which saw five ships sunk, while one U-boat was destroyed and two damaged In October 1941 she was with HG 75 which saw four ships and one escort sunk, and one U-boat destroyed.

US Navy
Heliotrope was transferred to the U.S. Navy at Hull, England, on 24 March 1942, one of a group of corvettes transferred to the U.S. Navy under reverse Lend-Lease. She was commissioned as USS Surprise the same day. She was delivered with British radars and armament installed, and over the course of her U.S. Navy service was gradually converted to U.S. standards. The  gun was mounted forward, the  gun aft.

Surprise sailed from Lisahally Co. Londonderry, Northern Ireland on 24 April 1942 to escort a convoy to Boston, Massachusetts. After an overhaul, she proceeded south and for the remainder of 1942 escorted convoys in the Caribbean Sea, principally between Trinidad and Guantanamo Bay, Cuba. In January 1943, she extended her range into the South Atlantic and, into 1944, performed escort runs between Trinidad and Recife, Brazil.

Surprise then returned to the United States. In May 1944, she returned to the North Atlantic and, until after the end of World War II in Europe in May 1945, rotated between Newfoundland, Greenland, and Iceland convoy runs and weather patrol duty.

Surprise was decommissioned on 20 August 1945 at Chatham, England, returned to the Royal Navy on 26 August, and struck from the Naval Vessel Register on 17 September.

Fate
She was transferred to China in 1947, and, after a period of mercantile service, she was taken into the People's Liberation Army Navy service as Linyi after converting to a gunboat, and finally retired in 1972.

Notes

References

 Clay Blair : Hitler’s U-Boat War Vol I  (1996) 
 Chesneau, Roger, ed. Conway's All the World's Fighting Ships 1922-1946. New York: Mayflower Books, 1980. .
 Elliott, Peter: Allied Escort Ships of World War II (1977) 
 Hague, Arnold : The Allied Convoy System 1939–1945 (2000)  (Canada) .  (UK)

External links
Photo gallery at navsource.org
USS Surprise at history.navy.mil
HMS Heliotrope at uboat.net

World War II patrol vessels of the United States
Ships built on the River Wear
1940 ships
Surprise
Corvettes of the People's Liberation Army Navy
Ships of the People's Liberation Army Navy